Cynthia Denise Course (born 20 September 1990) is a Seychellois female badminton player.

Achievements

All-Africa Games 
Women's doubles

BWF International Challenge/Series
Women's singles

Women's doubles

Mixed doubles

 BWF International Challenge tournament
 BWF International Series tournament
 BWF Future Series tournament

References

External links
 

1990 births
Living people
Seychellois female badminton players
Badminton players at the 2006 Commonwealth Games
Commonwealth Games competitors for Seychelles
Competitors at the 2007 All-Africa Games
Competitors at the 2011 All-Africa Games
Competitors at the 2015 African Games
African Games silver medalists for Seychelles
African Games bronze medalists for Seychelles
African Games medalists in badminton
20th-century Seychellois people
21st-century Seychellois people